The Tomb of Li Bai is the tomb of Li Bai, a Chinese poet acclaimed from his own day to the present as a genius and a romantic figure who took traditional poetic forms to new heights. The tomb is located at the western foot of Green Mountain in Dangtu County, Anhui, China.

History 
Li Bai died in 762, during the ruling of Emperor Suzong (756–762) of Tang dynasty (618–907). Li Yangbing, the then magistrate of Dangtu County and relative of Li Bai, buried him at the eastern foot of Dragon Mountain. In 817, Fan Chuanzheng, son of Li's friend, alongside Zhuge Zong, the then magistrate of Dangtu County, reburied him at the western foot of Green Mountain.

In 2006, it was declared a "Major National Historical and Cultural Sites in Anhui" by the State Council of China.

Gallery

References 

Buildings and structures in Ma'anshan
Buildings and structures completed in the 9th century
Tourist attractions in Ma'anshan
Dangtu County
Major National Historical and Cultural Sites in Anhui
Li Bai